The action of 9 August 1780 was a naval engagement of the American Revolutionary War, in which a Spanish fleet, led by Admiral Luis de Córdova y Córdova, along with a squadron of French ships, encountered a large British convoy. The Spanish and French force captured almost all the merchant vessels in the convoy, which dealt a severe blow to the commerce of Great Britain.

On 9 August, they encountered the Spanish fleet.

The Franco-Spanish fleet captured 55 of the 63 merchant vessels present, making it one of the most complete naval captures ever made. The losses, were, in total 80,000 muskets, equipment for 40,000 troops, 294 cannons, and 3,144 men. The financial impact of the losses were estimated to be around £1,500,000 (£1,000,000 in gold and £500,000 – £600,000 in equipment and ships). The action also helped to derail a secret British diplomatic effort to make peace with Spain. The loss was still remembered in Great Britain (by then the United Kingdom) 30 years later, at the height of the Napoleonic Wars.

Background
The British convoy sailed from Portsmouth, and consisted of 63 merchant vessels. The convoy included East Indiamen, West Indiamen, 18 victuallers, military storeships, and transports carrying the 90th Regiment of Foot. The troops were intended for service in the West Indies, and they had tents and camp equipment with them. Besides arms, ammunition, and a train of artillery, the five East India vessels carried a large quantity of naval-stores to supply the British squadron in that area.

On the morning of 2 August, the convoy fell in with the Channel Fleet. The Channel Fleet accompanied the convoy for several hours, to a point 112 leagues off the Isles of Scilly, where the two groups of ships parted company.

Interception
Following the instructions given to Luis de Córdova by Don Jose Moñino, count of Floridablanca, the Spanish fleet set sail from Cádiz and sailed as far as Madeira and the Canary Islands, where Don Luís deployed several frigates to spot the convoy. One of these frigates intercepted the convoy on the night of 8 August.

The news was greeted with caution, because there was doubt as to whether the ships were the Channel Fleet or the British convoy. The deputy Spanish commander, José de Mazarredo, called for an immediate attack. He concluded that there was no reason for the British fleet to be sailing so far from the Channel, and argued that all the suspected ships had to be a convoy under escort.

When strange sails (those of the Spanish fleet) were spotted, Captain Moutray signalled his ships to alter course and follow him close to the wind. The two frigates (Thetis and Southampton) and eight of the convoy followed the Ramillies and so escaped, but the rest of the British convoy mistook the lanterns at mast head of the Santísima Trinidad for those of their own commander, and fooled by a ruse of war, they steered accordingly. At daybreak, they found themselves intermingled with the Spanish fleet. Admiral de Cordova enveloped them, and hoisted signals to launch a general chase.

de Córdova's fleet captured 50 West Indiamen, including those chartered by the crown, and the five East Indiamen, Gatton, Godfrey, Hillsborough, Mountstuart and Royal George, totaling to 55 captured ships. The British loss was the worst disaster in the history of the East India Company. The 120-gun ship of the line Santísima Trinidad, the flagship of Admiral de Córdova, fired on Mountstuart and Godfrey to induce them to strike. Gatton was also attacked by the Purísima Concepción and set on fire, but the fire was later brought under control, and the ship was seized. A frigate flotilla, commanded by Santiago de Liniers, and part of the Concepción squadron, captured the 30-gun East Indiaman Hillsborough.

The captured British ships were brought to Cádiz, which was an unusual spectacle since the capture of such a great enemy convoy by any navy was an uncommon event; de Córdova's fleet did this on two occasions. All the ships, including the five East Indiamen, were incorporated into the Spanish merchant fleet. This was a major intelligence failure, for the British Admiralty did not learn of the presence of an enemy fleet at sea until 4 August, and neither did Geary nor Captain John Moutray.

Aftermath

The Spaniards behaved with great humanity to their prisoners, repaying the generous treatment which their countrymen had been given by Admiral Rodney.

This Spanish victory, compounded by the serious storm losses in the Caribbean, produced a financial crisis among marine insurance underwriters throughout Europe. Many went bankrupt, and war insurance rates, already remarkably high due to the presence of privateers, were driven to intolerable levels. It also increased and made increasingly public the dissatisfaction which prevailed against the ministry, and against the conduct and government of the Royal Navy.

This successful interception shows that the English fleet, dispersed in too many theaters of operations, lost control of the Atlantic routes in 1780.

The five British East Indiaman were brought into Spanish service. The Spanish navy commissioned the 30-gun Hillsborough as the 12-gun store-ship Santa Clotilde, the 28-gun Mountstuart as the 34-gun Santa Balvina, the 28-gun Royal George as the 40-gun Real Jorge, the 28-gun Godfrey as the 34-gun Santa Biviana and the 28-gun Gatton as the 34-gun Santa Paula.

Among the British merchantmen who managed to escape were British Queen and Fanny, whose copper sheathing helped distance their pursuers.

Footnotes

References
 Syrett, David. The Royal Navy in European Waters during the American Revolutionary War. University of South Carolina Press. 
 Botta, Carlo. History of the war of the independence of the United States of America New Haven : N. Whiting  publishing (1837) ASIN B002XXBVAU
 
 Parkinson N, C. The Trade Winds: A Study of British Overseas Trade during the French wars, 1793–1815. Routledge; Reprint edition. 
 Volo, M. James. Blue Water Patriots: The American Revolution Afloat, Rowman & Littlefield Publishers, Inc. (2008) 
 Guthrie, William. A New Geographical, Historical And Commercial Grammar And Present State Of The World.Complete With 30 Fold Out Maps – All Present. J. Johnson Publishing (1808) ASIN B002N220JC
 Ramsay, David. Universal History Americanized, or an Historical View of the World from the Earliest Records to the Nineteenth Century, with a Particular Reference to the State of Society, Literature, Religion, and Form of Government of the United States of America. Vol. VI (1819)
 Bisset, Robert. The History of the Reign of George Iii. to Which Is Prefixed, a View of the Progressive Improvement of England, in Prosperity and Strength, to the Accession of His Majesty. Vol III (1820)
 Gordon, William. The history of the rise, progress, and establishment of the Independence of the United States of America, Books for Libraries Press (1969) 
 The London Encyclopaedia, Or Universal Dictionary Of Science, Art, Literature And Practical Mechanics, Comprising A Popular View Of The Present State Of Knowledge, Vol X. Thomas Tegg Publishing. London (1829).
 Campbell, Thomas. Annals of Great Britain from the ascension of George III to the peace of Amiens, Printed by Mundell and co., for Silvester Doig and Andrew Stirling (1811).
 The London Encyclopaedia 
 The Scots Magazine. MDCCLXXXIII. Volume XLV, Edinburgh: Printed by Murray and Cochran.
 Guthrie, William & Ferguson, James. A new geographical, historical, and commercial grammar and present...  J & J House Booksellers, London. (1806)
  Fernández de Navarrete, Martín. Biblioteca marítima española: obra póstuma del excmo: Vol. 2
  José Montero y Aróstegui. Historia y descripción de la Ciudad y Departamento naval del Ferrol (Google Ebook)
  Vela Cuadros, Rubén. Presas de la Armada Española 1779-1828: listado de buques apresados e incorporados a la Real Armada por apresamiento. 2017.
  Rodríguez González, Agustín Ramón. Victorias por mar de los Españoles. Biblioteca de Historia. Madrid 2006.

Conflicts in 1780
Naval battles involving France
Naval battles involving Spain
Naval battles involving Great Britain
Naval battles of the Anglo-Spanish War (1779–1783)
Naval battles of the American Revolutionary War
Naval battles of the American Revolutionary War involving Spain